Valborg Eriksdotter (1545-1580), was the royal mistress of Magnus, Duke of Östergötland, between 1560 and 1567. She was the only official mistress of Magnus with the exception of Anna von Haugwitz. She was the mother of the acknowledged illegitimate daughter of Magnus, Lucretia Magnusdotter (Gyllenhielm). 

Valborg Eriksdotter background is unconfirmed, but she is believed to be the daughter of a vicar. It is noted that she could read and write, which was not common at the time. She became the official mistress of Magnus in 1560, and followed him to Vadstena when he left court to reside at Vadstena Castle as duke of Ostrogothia. In 1563, Magnus became mentally ill, and his brother, Eric XIV of Sweden, gave her many gifts to make her stay with Magnus during his illness. She demanded, and was granted, an entire private floor as residence for her and her children at Vadstena Castle. She also visited the court at Stockholm, and she is believed to be the unidentified royal mistress who were mentioned as a friend of Karin Månsdotter during the Sture Murders in 1567. She was still the mistress of Magnus at Nyköping Castle the autumn of 1567, but by November, the relationship seem to have been terminated.     

Valborg Eriksdotter married by autumn 1567 a "Master Hans" who is otherwise unidentified. It is noted that she visited Magnus during late 1567, and that she, by all accounts, was regarded to have a good effect upon him. She became a widow the autumn of 1568 and was awarded several estates which provided her with a good income by king John III. She married shortly afterward with an unidentified man, believed to have been a nobleman or an officer. She died on one of her estates in 1580, likely of the plague which was present in Sweden at that year.

References 
 Gadd, Pia (Swedish): Frillor, fruar och herrar - en okänd kvinnohistoria (Mistresses, wives and masters - an unknown history of women) Falun 2009

Mistresses of Swedish royalty
1545 births
1580 deaths
16th-century deaths from plague (disease)